Below is a list of cities and airports served by the Portuguese airline TAP Express on behalf of its parent company TAP Portugal.

Africa

Morocco
Casablanca - Mohammed V International Airport
Marrakech - Marrakech-Menara Airport
Tangier - Tangier Ibn Battouta Airport

Europe

France
Bordeaux - Bordeaux–Mérignac Airport
Lyon - Lyon-Saint Exupéry Airport
Marseille - Marseille Provence Airport
Nantes - Nantes Atlantique Airport
Nice - Côte d'Azur Airport
Paris - Paris-Orly Airport
Toulouse - Toulouse Blagnac Airport

Germany
Cologne - Cologne Bonn Airport
Stuttgart - Stuttgart Airport 
Düsseldorf - Düsseldorf Airport

Netherlands
Amsterdam - Amsterdam Airport Schiphol

Luxembourg
Luxembourg - Luxembourg Findel Airport

Portugal
Faro - Faro Airport
Lisbon - Lisbon Portela Airport base
Porto - Francisco Sá Carneiro Airport base
Porto Santo - Porto Santo Airport

Spain
Barcelona - Barcelona-El Prat Airport
Gran Canaria - Gran Canaria Airport 
Madrid - Adolfo Suárez Madrid–Barajas Airport
Bilbao - Bilbao Airport
Alicante - Alicante-Elche Airport 
Valencia - Valencia Airport
A Coruña - A Coruña Airport
Asturias - Asturias Airport
Málaga - Málaga Airport
Sevilla - Sevilla Airport
Vigo - Vigo Airport

United Kingdom
London - Gatwick Airport (Retired)
London - London City Airport (Retired)
Manchester - Manchester Airport (Retired)
London - Heathrow Airport
Switzerland
Zurich - Zurich Airport

References

TAP Express